Wendy Tokuda is an American television journalist.

Biography 
Tokuda was a reporter and anchor for KING-TV in Seattle, Washington from 1974 to 1977, then went on to KPIX in San Francisco as reporter and co-anchor for the station's evening newscasts with Dave McElhatton for 14 years.

In 1991, Tokuda joined KNBC in Los Angeles as reporter and weekend anchor alongside Bill Lagattuta, then with Rick Chambers. The following year, she moved to weekdays at 5 p.m. and 11 p.m. alongside Paul Moyer, who had rejoined KNBC after 13 years at KABC-TV. However, after a few months. Tokuda left both newscasts and was reassigned to the 6 p.m. news with Jess Marlow. In 1997, Tokuda returned to San Francisco and became co-anchor for the 4 p.m. newscast on KRON-TV with Pam Moore.

Tokuda left KRON-TV and returned to KPIX in 2007. She then took on special projects, such as "Students Rising Above", a program profiling low-income high school students who want to go to college.

She retired on August 19, 2016.

References

External links 
 Former KPIX Anchor Wendy Tokuda Recalls Covering Loma Prieta Quake - KPIX CBS SF Bay Area, October 17, 2019
 Wendy Tokuda interview — memories of KPIX, Dave McElhatton and more Total SF:Podcasts,

American women journalists of Asian descent
American people of Japanese descent
Living people
Year of birth missing (living people)
Journalists from Washington (state)
21st-century American women
Television anchors from San Francisco